Oligocentria lignicolor, the white-streaked prominent moth or lacecapped caterpillar, is a moth of the  family Notodontidae. It is found in North America, including Connecticut, Georgia, Illinois, Louisiana, Massachusetts, Mississippi, Missouri, New Brunswick, New Jersey, New York, North Carolina, Oklahoma and Pennsylvania.

The wingspan is about 38 mm.

The larvae feed on the leaves of Fagus, Castanea and Quercus species. They feed along the leaf margins. Early instars are gregarious and yellow in colour. Full-grown larvae are about 45 mm long and blotched and mottled in green white and brown.

Gallery

References

Moths described in 1855
Notodontidae
Moths of North America
Taxa named by Francis Walker (entomologist)